Sue Ellen's is a ladies bar or lesbian bar in Dallas, Texas' gayborhood of Oak Lawn. It first opened in Dallas on January 19, 1989, and moved to its current Throckmorton Street location in 2008.
Sue Ellen's, a two-story nightclub, has a long history of being part of Dallas' queer nightlife, and is the state's oldest lesbian bar.

It is named for Sue Ellen Ewing of Dallas fame and is considered the sister bar to nearby JR's.

See also
Lesbian Bar Project

References

External links

1989 establishments in Texas
Bars (establishments)
LGBT culture in Texas
LGBT nightclubs in Texas
Nightclubs in Texas
Lesbian culture in Texas